Every late January–early February since 1950, the National Football League (NFL) hosts the Pro Bowl, its all-star game. Players are selected by the votes of coaches, other players, and fans. As of 2013, the Houston Texans have sent 20 different players to the Pro Bowl since their establishment in 2002 for a total of 37 appearances; Andre Johnson has been invited seven times (although he did not play the fifth time due to an ankle injury), Arian Foster has been invited three times, while Mario Williams, Owen Daniels, Matt Schaub, DeMeco Ryans, Johnathan Joseph, Chris Myers, J. J. Watt, Duane Brown, and Antonio Smith have all been invited twice. Jerome Mathis, Vonta Leach, Gary Walker, Aaron Glenn, Brian Cushing, Wade Smith, Bryan Braman, James Casey, and Danieal Manning have all been selected once, although Cushing decided to skip the Pro Bowl due to various injuries he sustained during the 2009 NFL season.

The first Pro Bowl selections from the Houston Texans were during their inaugural year. These were two players acquired in the 2002 NFL Expansion Draft, Walker and Glenn. This was followed two years later by the selection of Johnson, the third-overall pick in the previous year's draft. Their first undrafted player to go to the Pro Bowl was Foster after the 2010 season. Foster has since been selected twice more. The 2013 Pro Bowl roster featured eight Texans, a team record, leading the AFC.

Pro Bowl selections
The list below is of all players who accepted their invitation to the Pro Bowl while on the Houston Texans' starting roster. It includes the player's name, position on the Texans' roster, position on the Pro Bowl depth chart (starter, reserve and alternate) and their regular season statistics while playing at their listed position (i.e., wide receivers who also played cornerback would not have their defensive statistics listed).

Notes
 Prior to 1950, the NFL played five NFL All-Star Games from 1938 to 1942, where an all-star team played against that year's champions. 
 Sources:
 The years given are for the calendar year the Pro Bowl was held in, not the corresponding NFL season.
 Lead the league in the specified statistic.
 Joseph was acquired by the Texans in free agency during the 2011 offseason, he was drafted 26th overall by the Cincinnati Bengals in the 2004 Draft.

References

Pro Bowlers
Lists of Pro Bowl selections by National Football League team
Pro Bowl selections